Makhourédia Guèye, born Mamadou Guèye, was a Senegalese film and theatre actor known for his roles in films written and directed by Ousmane Sembène.

Filmography

Film
Mandabi (1968) - Ibrahima Dieng
Lambaaye (1972)
Garga M'Bossé (1975) - Manel Gueye
Xala (1975) - the president
Ceddo (1977) - the king
Jom ou l'histoire d'un peuple (1981) - Canar Fall
Hyenas (1992) - the mayor

Television
Lat Dior

References

2008 deaths
Senegalese actors
Senegalese musicians
People from Dakar